Francis Bay (27 December 1914 – 24 April 2005) was a Belgian conductor. Born as Frans Bayezt, he conducted many Belgian entries in the Eurovision Song Contest and had his own Big band orchestra titled "Francis Bay and His Big Band''.

References

External links
 

1914 births
2005 deaths
Belgian conductors (music)
Male conductors (music)
Eurovision Song Contest conductors
Belgian film score composers
Male film score composers
20th-century conductors (music)
20th-century Belgian male musicians